USS Santa Fe (SSN-763), a , is the second ship of the United States Navy to be named for Santa Fe, New Mexico. The contract to build her was awarded to the Electric Boat Division of General Dynamics Corporation in Groton, Connecticut on 21 March 1986 and her keel was laid down on 9 July 1991. She was launched on 12 December 1992 sponsored by Mrs. Joy Johnson, and commissioned on 8 January 1994, with Commander Rodger P. Krull in command.

Operational history
Santa Fe'''s maiden deployment was in 1997 to the Persian Gulf and Western Pacific.  In 1998, she completed a Selected Restricted Availability in Pearl Harbor Naval Shipyard.  In 1999, she was again deployed to the Persian Gulf and Western Pacific earning a Meritorious Unit Commendation and Coast Guard Meritorious Unit Commendation. In 2001, she deployed to the Western Pacific and Persian Gulf earning two Meritorius Unit Commendations as well as earning her first coveted CSS-7 Battle E.Santa Fe deployed to the Western Pacific in September 2003 until March 2004. For this deployment she participated in ANNUALEX '03 with the Japanese Maritime Defense Force. The ship made port calls in Singapore, Guam, multiple times in Sasebo, Japan, and in Yokosuka, Japan in which she rode out a typhoon while in port. Santa Fe was awarded the Navy Unit Commendation, the second highest award given to a submarine, for actions completed on this deployment. She underwent a three-month Interim drydocking in October 2004.

After the ship completed sea trials and other various workups she then completed a two-month Eastern Pacific Deployment that started in May 2005. After returning to her homeport of Pearl Harbor in June 2005, she again deployed to the Western Pacific on 9 August 2005. During this deployment she participated in Exercise Malabar with the Indian Navy. Santa Fe was the second U.S. nuclear submarine to participate in the exercise and also to port in Goa, India. After Malabar, the ship made a brief stop in Phuket, Thailand. She was the first U.S. submarine to visit Phuket since 2001. The ship returned to Pearl Harbor in February 2006. She made the transit to the East Coast in July 2006, surfacing near the North Pole on the way and stopping in Brest, France.

USS Santa Fe completed a major repair period lasting 18 months at the Portsmouth Naval Shipyard in Kittery, Maine. After undergoing sea trials at Naval Submarine Base Kings Bay, Georgia and transiting through the Panama Canal, she has returned to her homeport of Pearl Harbor, HI.

After shipyard she completed a six-month Western Pacific deployment from May–November 2009, after stops in Singapore, Saipan, Guam, Okinawa, JP, and Yokosuka, JP.  
She received the Battle "E" Award in January 2010.Santa Fe returned 24 August 2011 to Joint Base Pearl Harbor–Hickam after successfully completing a six-month deployment to the western Pacific region.  During this deployment Santa Fe skillfully conducted four operations of great importance to national security by safely operating in a demanding and challenging undersea environment, directly enhancing fleet, theater and national objectives. The crew displayed exceptional tactical skill, tenacity and perseverance while operating under extremely challenging conditions to prepare the battle space for future operations. Santa Fe's tactical acumen was further displayed by their highly successful participation in Exercise Malabar, a bilateral exercise with the Indian navy.  
Port calls included Sasebo, Japan (x3), Chinhae, South Korea; Yokosuka, Japan; Guam, and Subic Bay, Philippines. 
In recognition of their outstanding performance, Santa Fe'' received the COMSUBRON 7 Battle "E" Award and was awarded the Navy Unit Commendation by the Secretary of the Navy.

Awards 

 2000 – Arleigh Burke Fleet Trophy for most improved ship in the Fleet.
 2001 – Marjorie Sterrett Battleship Fund Award
 2001, 2004, 2009, and 2011, 2015 – COMSUBRON 7 Battle Efficiency "E" Award.
 2003, 2012 – Navy Unit Commendation by the SECNAV (2nd highest award that can be given to a Naval vessel)
 2006 – Navy Meritorious Unit Commendation

See also 
 David Marquet (former captain)

References

External links

 USS Santa Fe Official Website
 Santa Fe Wins Arleigh Burke Trophy
 Submarine Commodore Mentioned in Covey Book
 SANTA FE wins 2011 CSS-7 Battle E
 SANTA FE earns Navy Unit Commendation

Los Angeles-class submarines
Nuclear submarines of the United States Navy
Ships built in Groton, Connecticut
1992 ships
Submarines of the United States